Fluticasone furoate/vilanterol (FF/VI), sold under the brand name Breo Ellipta among others, is a combination medication for the treatment of chronic obstructive pulmonary disease (COPD) and asthma. It contains fluticasone furoate, an inhaled corticosteroid, and vilanterol, an ultra-long-acting β2 agonist (ultra-LABA).

In 2013, the drug was approved for use in the United States by the Food and Drug Administration (FDA) for long-term maintenance treatment of airflow obstruction in people with COPD, including chronic bronchitis and emphysema, and the European Medicines Agency approved it as a second-line therapy for the treatment of COPD and asthma. There were, however, concerns that LABAs such as vilanterol increase the risk of deaths due to asthma. In 2017, the FDA states that they were not justified.

It is on the World Health Organization's List of Essential Medicines. In 2020, it was the 115th most commonly prescribed medication in the United States, with more than 5million prescriptions.

History

Approval 
This drug was approved by the FDA for use as a long-term, once-daily, maintenance treatment in people with COPD in 2013.  Labeling changed on 30 April 2015, to add an indication for a once-daily treatment of asthma in people 18 years or older. The exclusivity for a new product ended in May 2016, in the United States, and the exclusivity on the indication for asthma expired on 30 April 2018. The patent for both indications expires on 3 August 2021. The European Medicines Agency approved the drug for marketing on 13 November 2013.

Society and culture

Commercial information 
GlaxoSmithKline manufactures this drug. As of 31 December 2015, FF/VI inhalation powder was approved for marketing in 73 countries, and had been launched in 45 countries. Within the trade name, the "Ellipta" is the dry powder inhaler that the medication is administered in. Innoviva developed the active substance vilanterol, and receives royalties on sales.

Research 
There is tentative evidence as of 2016 that it is better than placebo for asthma. Evidence is less strong in children.

References

External links 
 

Combination drugs
Drugs acting on the respiratory system
Long-acting beta2-adrenergic agonists
GSK plc brands